Amazing may refer to:

Music

Performers
 The Amazing, a Swedish indie rock band

Albums
 Amazing (Banaroo album), 2006
 Amazing (Elkie Brooks album), 1996
 Amazing (Marcia Hines album) or the title song, 2014
 Amazin (Trina album) or the title song, 2010
 Amazing: The Best of Alex Lloyd or the title song (see below), 2006

Songs
 "Amazing" (Aerosmith song), 1993
 "Amazing" (Alex Lloyd song), 2001
 "Amazing" (Danny Saucedo song), 2012
 "Amazing" (Foxes song), 2016
 "Amazing" (Francesca Michielin song), 2014
 "Amazing" (George Michael song), 2004
 "Amazing" (High and Mighty Color song), 2007
 "Amazing" (Inna song), 2009
 "Amazing" (Josh Kelley song), 2003
 "Amazing" (Kanye West song), 2009
 "Amazin'" (LL Cool J song), 2003
 "Amazing" (Matt Cardle song), 2012
 "Amazing" (Seal song), 2007
 "Amazing" (Tanja song), representing Estonia at Eurovision 2014
 "Amazing" (Vanessa Amorosi song), 2011
 "Amazing" (Westlife song), 2006
 "Amazing", by Andy Hunter° from Exodus
 "Amazing", by Big Time Rush from 24/Seven
 "Amazing", by David Banner from Sex, Drugs & Video Games
 "Amazing", by Judith Durham and the Seekers from Future Road
 "Amazing", by Madonna from Music
 "Amazing", by Mystery Skulls from Mystery Skulls
 "Amazing", by Nav from Bad Habits
 "Amazing", by T.I. from No Mercy
 "Amazing", by Tin Machine from Tin Machine

Other uses
 Amazing (film), a 2013 Chinese film
 Amazing (gamer), Maurice Stückenschneider, German professional League of Legends player
 A*mazing, a 1990s Australian children's television game show
 Amazing, a 1984 Macintosh game

See also
 
 
 "Amazing Grace", a 1972 gospel song
 Amazing Labyrinth, a boardgame
 Amazing Stories (a.k.a. Amazing Science Fiction), a science fiction magazine published from 1926 to 2006
 Amazing Stories (1985 TV series), a television anthology series from 1985 to 1987